Dowlat Qarin may refer to:
 Dowlat Qarin-e Olya